Arie Theodorus van Deursen (23 June 1931 – 21 November 2011) was a Dutch historian whose focus was the early modern period. He was Professor Emeritus of History at the Vrije Universiteit in Amsterdam. He was a specialist in Dutch history of the 16th and 17th century.

Career
Arie van Deursen was born at Groningen.  He was a prolific author with a refined style. He has written several books about daily life in the Dutch Golden Age, religious controversies in the 16th and 17th century (Jacobus Arminius versus Franciscus Gomarus) and the political situation of that period; he wrote biographies of William the Silent and Maurice of Nassau, Prince of Orange, a history of the Vrije Universiteit, a history of the Netherlands (1555–1702), a biography of Michiel de Ruyter and several volumes of collected essays.

As an orthodox Protestant Christian, Van Deursen was heavily involved in polemics about the history of secularization and its consequences. In his Huizinga Lecture, Huizinga en de geest der eeuw (Huizinga and the spirit of the age) Van Deursen compared the critical evaluation of the secularization by Isaäc da Costa and Johan Huizinga. Van Deursen died in Oegstgeest on 21 November 2011, aged 80.

He was member of the Royal Netherlands Academy of Arts and Sciences.

Books (Dutch)
 Professions et métiers interdits: Un aspect de l'histoire de la révocation de l'Édit de Nantes, Groningen: Wolters, 1960 (doctoral thesis)
 Honni soit qui mal y pense? De Republiek tussen de mogendheden (1610–1612), Amsterdam: Noord-Hollandsche Uitgevers Maatschappij, 1965
 Bavianen en slijkgeuzen: Kerk en kerkvolk ten tijde van Maurits en Oldenbarnevelt, Assen: Van Gorcum, 1974
 Mensen van klein vermogen: Het kopergeld van de Gouden Eeuw, Amsterdam: Bert Bakker, 1991. Translated into English: Plain lives in the Golden Age. Popular culture, religion and society in seventeenth-century Holland. Cambridge: Cambridge University Press, 1991.
 Volume 1, Het dagelijks brood
 Volume 2, Volkscultuur
 Volume 3, Volk en overheid
 Volume 4, Hel en hemel
 Een dorp in de polder: Graft in de zeventiende eeuw, Amsterdam: Bert Bakker, 1994
 Willem van Oranje: een biografisch portret, Amsterdam: Bert Bakker, 1995
 De Bataafse revolutie (1795–1995), Apeldoorn: Willem de Zwijgerstichting, 1995
 Geleefd geloven: geschiedenis van de protestantse vroomheid in Nederland (coauthor: G.J. Schutte), Assen: Van Gorcum, 1996
 Maurits van Nassau, 1567-1625: de winnaar die faalde, Amsterdam: Bert Bakker, 2000
 Rust niet voordat gy ze van buiten kunt: de Tien Geboden in de 17e eeuw, Kampen: De Groot Goudriaan, 2004
 De last van veel geluk: De geschiedenis van Nederland 1555-1702, Amsterdam: Bert Bakker, 2004
 Een hoeksteen in het verzuilde bestel: De Vrije Universiteit 1880-2005, Amsterdam: Bert Bakker, 2005
 De admiraal: De wereld van Michiel Adriaenszoon de Ruyter, Franeker: Van Wijnen, 2007
 In Katwijk is alles anders. Een christelijk dorp ontmoet de wereld, 1940-2005. Amsterdam: Uitgeverij Bert Bakker, 2011.

Notes

1931 births
2011 deaths
Dutch Calvinist and Reformed Christians
Members of the Royal Netherlands Academy of Arts and Sciences
Academic staff of Vrije Universiteit Amsterdam
People from Groningen (city)
20th-century Dutch historians
20th-century Dutch male writers
21st-century Dutch historians
21st-century Dutch male writers